The 2017 season was St. Patrick's Athletic F.C.'s 88th year in existence and was the Supersaint's 66th consecutive season in the top-flight of Irish football. It was the sixth year that Liam Buckley is the team's manager (in his current spell), following replacing Pete Mahon in December 2011. With the new change to the League of Ireland structure, 3 clubs were set to be relegated from the Premier Division, which has created an intense relegation between many clubs, including Pats' due to their lower budget than previous years following a poor 2016 season in which they finished 7th in the league, making 2017 the first year in 7 years without European football. The relegation battle went right down to the last day of the season, where Pat's secured the necessary point to stay up following a 1–1 draw away to Derry City.

Squad

Transfers

Pre-season

In

Out

Mid-season

In

Out

Squad statistics

Appearances, goals and cards
Number in brackets represents (appearances of which were substituted ON).
Last Updated – 28 October 2017

Top scorers
Includes all competitive matches.
Last updated 28 October 2017

Top assists
Includes all competitive matches.
Last updated 28 October 2017

Top Clean Sheets
Includes all competitive matches.
Last updated 28 October 2017

Disciplinary record

Captains

Club

Coaching staff
Manager: Liam Buckley
Head Of Player Recruitment/Coach: Dave Campbell
Coach/Director of Football: Ger O'Brien
Coach: Darius Kierans
Goalkeeping coach: Pat Jennings
Chartered Physiotherapist/Strength and Conditioning Coach: Mark Kenneally
Coaches Assistant: Graeme Buckley
Physiotherapist: Christy O'Neill
Club Doctor: Dr Matt Corcoran
Kit Man: Derek Haines
Equipment Manager: David McGill
Under 19's Manager: Gareth Dodrill
Under 19's Assistant Manager: Martin Doyle
Under 19's Coach: Sean Doody
Under 17's Manager: Jamie Moore
Under 17's Assistant Manager: Darragh O'Reilly
Under 17's Assistant Manager: Sean Gahan
Under 15's Manager: Denis Hyland
Under 15's Assistant Manager: Sean O'Connor
Under 15's Coach: Paul Webb
Under 19's/17's/15's Coach: Keith Andrews
Under 19's/17's Goalkeeping Coach: Stephen O'Reilly

Kit

|
|
|
|
|}

The club released a new Away kit for the season, with the Home and Third kits being retained from the 2016 season. The club's Main Shirt Sponsor, Clune Construction Company L.P.'s sponsorship deal came to an end leaving a vacancy for a new shirt sponsor. This vacancy was filled when the club voluntarily donated their shirt sponsorship place to local suicide prevention charity, Pieta House.

Key:
LOI=League of Ireland Premier Division
FAI=FAI Cup
EAC=EA Sports Cup
LSC=Leinster Senior Cup
FRN=Friendly

Competitions

League of Ireland

League table

Results summary

Results by round

Matches

FAI Cup

EA Sports Cup

Leinster Senior Cup

Friendlies

Pre-season

Mid-season

References

2017
2017 League of Ireland Premier Division by club